Jim McCue (1889-1971) was an Australian rugby league footballer who played in the 1910s.

A Newtown junior player, McCue was a second row forward in the early years of the NSWRFL. He played nine seasons with Newtown before retiring aged 30 in 1919. McCue was a younger brother of the legendary Paddy McCue.

Death
McCue died on 13 December 1971, age 82.

References

1889 births
1971 deaths
Australian rugby league players
Newtown Jets players
Rugby league second-rows
Rugby league players from New South Wales